The 22183 / 84 Bhopal Habibganj–Indore Junction AC Double Decker Express is a Express train belonging to Indian Railways – West Central Railway zone that runs between  and  in India.

It operates as train number 22183 from Bhopal Habibganj to Indore Junction and as train number 22184 in the reverse direction, serving the state of Madhya Pradesh.

Coaches

The 22183 / 84 Bhopal Habibganj–Indore Junction AC Double Decker Express on introduction had 11 AC Chair Car coaches but owing to poor response presently has only 3 AC Chair Car coaches. It does not have a pantry car.

As is customary with most train services in India, coach composition may be amended at the discretion of Indian Railways depending on demand.

Service

22183 Bhopal Habibganj–Indore Junction AC Double Decker Express covers the distance of 224 kilometres in 3 hours 35 mins (62.51 km/hr) & in 4 hours 00 mins as 22184 Indore Junction–Bhopal Habibganj AC Double Decker Express (56.00 km/hr).

As the average speed of the train is above 55 km/hr, as per Indian Railways rules, its fare includes a Superfast surcharge.

Routeing

The 22183 / 84 Bhopal Habibganj–Indore Junction AC Double Decker Express runs from Bhopal Habibganj via Bairgarh, Maksi,  to Indore Junction.

Traction

As the route is fully electrified, it is powered by a Tuglakabad-based WAP-7 for its entire run .

Timings

22183 Bhopal Habibganj–Indore Junction AC Double Decker Express leaves Bhopal Habibganj on a daily basis at 06:00 hrs IST and reaches Indore Junction at 09:35 hrs IST the same day.
22184 Indore Junction–Bhopal Habibganj AC Double Decker Express leaves Indore Junction on a daily basis at 19:20 hrs IST and reaches Bhopal Habibganj at 23:20 hrs IST the same day.

References 

http://timesofindia.indiatimes.com/city/indore/Indore-Bhopal-double-decker-to-go-off-tracks-on-Aug-13/articleshow/39860501.cms
http://www.dnaindia.com/india/report-indore-bhopal-double-decker-runs-with-only-8-passengers-1915681
http://thehitavada.com/news-details/double-decker-train-to-continue-plying-between-habibganj-and-indore

External links

Transport in Bhopal
Transport in Indore
Rail transport in Madhya Pradesh
Double-decker trains of India
Defunct trains in India
Railway services introduced in 2013
Railway services discontinued in 2015